Nasir al-Dawla was a Hamdanid emir of Aleppo in 935–967. 

The same honorific title was also borne by:

 Badis ibn al-Mansur (d. 1016), Zirid emir of Ifriqiya in 996–1016
 Nasir al-Dawla ibn Hamdan (d. 1073), great-grandson of the Hamdanid emir and general in Fatimid service
 Nasr al-Dawla Ahmad ibn Marwan (1079–1085), a Marwanid ruler.
 Nasir-ud-Daulah (1794–1857), the Nizam of Hyderabad in 1829–1857